Oi  is an interjection used in various varieties of the English language, particularly Australian English, British English, Indian English, Irish English, New Zealand English, and South African English, as well as non-English languages such as Chinese, Tagalog, Tamil, Hindi/Urdu, Japanese, and Portuguese to get the attention of another person or to express surprise or disapproval. It is sometimes used in Canadian English and very rarely in American English. The word is also common in the Indian subcontinent, where it has varied pronunciations of "O-ee" and "O-ye".

"Oi" has been particularly associated with working class and Cockney speech. It is effectively a local pronunciation of "hoy" (see H-dropping), an older expression. A study of the Cockney dialect in the 1950s found that whether it was being used to call attention or as a challenge depended on its tone and abruptness. The study's author noted that the expression is "jaunty and self-assertive" as well as "intensely cockney".

A poll of non-English speakers by the British Council in 2004 found that "oi" was considered the 61st most beautiful word in the English language. A spokesman commented that "Oi is not a word that I would've thought turned up in English manuals all that often." "Oi" was added to the list of acceptable words in US Scrabble in 2006.

In other languages
According to Friedrich Nietzsche, in Greek,  was an expression of pain, and someone who was in pain or miserable was said to be . In Latin, the similar  was a cry of pain. Coincidentally, the term  in informal Japanese is used in the same way as British English, typically by older men to subordinates; an elongated  is used when someone is at a distance.

In Catalan,  is used at the end of a question, with a meaning similar to "isn't it?"

In dialects of rural central Iranian Persian language and Luri language,  has the same usage as in English.

In the Indian subcontinent, such as in India and Pakistan,  is also used as an exclamation in various contexts.

In Russian,  is often used as an expression of various degrees of surprise.

In the Scandinavian languages,  or the Swedish variant, is commonly used as an exclamation of surprise, like "Oh" or "Whoops".

This is commonly used throughout the Philippines with friends and family as an attention-grabbing interjection, but is rarely used with strangers per social customs.

It is can used in conjunction with a name or a pronoun. For example,  is used to get the attention of a waiter in a restaurant, or a teacher in a classroom. It is used in every social setting in Vietnam from family to business environments.

In popular culture

The 1937 musical song The Lambeth Walk from Me and My Girl ends with a cry of "Oi!", expressing defiance and transgression of the working-class characters; it was newsworthy when King George VI of the United Kingdom and Queen Elizabeth were at one performance and "with the rest of the audience, cocked their thumbs and shouted Oi!"

The phrase gained a certain notoriety due to a British working-class punk rock subgenre being named Oi!. Originating in the late 1970s, the genre and its associated subculture had the goal of bringing together punks, skinheads and other working-class youths. The term was later used in the Blur song "Parklife", which exemplified its appeal to a new generation of mockneys. The term also evolved to be used in Multicultural London English; a 2002 UK Top 10 hit by the grime music group More Fire Crew was titled "Oi!".

See also
Oggy Oggy Oggy
Aussie Aussie Aussie, Oi Oi Oi
Oy vey, a similar-sounding Yiddish exclamation for dismay
 Yo

References

British slang
Irish slang
Australian slang
New Zealand slang
Interjections
English language in London
English words